Duane A. Gamble is a retired United States Army major general who, as a lieutenant general, served as the deputy chief of staff for logistics of the United States Army from September 2019 to April 2022. Previously, he was the commanding general of the United States Army Sustainment Command from July 2017 to August 2019.

Suspension
Gamble was suspended from his position as the deputy chief of staff for logistics on February 16, 2022 “pending the final outcome of a Department of the Army inspector general investigation into allegations of creating or fostering a counterproductive leadership environment”. Once the investigation substantiated that Gamble engaged in counterproductive leadership, he was officially relieved of duty and reassigned as a special assistant to the director of the Army Staff in April 2022, reverting to his permanent rank of major general.

References

Lieutenant generals
Living people
Place of birth missing (living people)
Recipients of the Distinguished Service Medal (US Army)
Recipients of the Legion of Merit
United States Army generals
United States Army personnel of the Gulf War
United States Army personnel of the Iraq War
United States Army personnel of the War in Afghanistan (2001–2021)
Year of birth missing (living people)